Uraga may refer to:
 Uraga (moth), a genus of moth

Places 
 Uraga (woreda), in the Oromia Region, Ethiopia
 Uraga, Kanagawa (:ja:浦賀), a subdivision of the city of Yokosuka, Kanagawa Prefecture, Japan
 Uraga Station (:ja:浦賀駅)
 Uraga Channel (浦賀湾), at the south end of Tokyo Bay in Japan

Ships 
 Uraga class mine warfare command ship, Japan Maritime Self-Defence Forces
 

ja:うらが